The 2015 Orienteering World Cup was the 21st edition of the Orienteering World Cup. The 2015 Orienteering World Cup consisted of 11 events, all individual competitions. The events were located in Australia, Norway, Sweden, United Kingdom and Switzerland. The 2015 World Orienteering Championships in Inverness, Scotland, United Kingdom was included in the World Cup.

Daniel Hubmann of Switzerland won his second consecutive overall title in the men's World Cup, his sixth title in total. Tove Alexandersson of Sweden won her second overall title in the women's World Cup.

Events

Men

Women

Points distribution
The 40 best runners in each event were awarded points. In the final race (WC 11), the runners were awarded a double number of points.

Overall standings
This section shows the final standings after all 11 individual events.

Achievements
Only individual competitions.

External links
 World Cup Ranking - IOF

References

Orienteering World Cup seasons
Orienteering competitions
2015 in orienteering